The Sayre City Park is a public park located along historic U.S. Route 66 on the south end of Sayre, Oklahoma. The park formally opened in 1940; however, the land had been owned by the city and used informally as a park for several years prior. The Works Progress Administration built the park's structures according to plans designed by J.N. Willis. The park's bathhouse and swimming pool, the dominant features of the park, have a Pueblo Revival design with ornamental vigas. Other park features include a miniature golf course, a gazebo, and tennis courts. The park attracted both locals and travelers on Route 66, who regularly camped in the park. A local business district also developed around the park, primarily to serve tourists.

The park was added to the National Register of Historic Places on March 3, 2004.

See also

References

External links

Parks on the National Register of Historic Places in Oklahoma
Pueblo Revival architecture
Buildings and structures completed in 1940
Buildings and structures in Beckham County, Oklahoma
U.S. Route 66 in Oklahoma
National Register of Historic Places in Beckham County, Oklahoma